Sint-Denijs-Westrem is a village in the Belgian province of East Flanders. It is part of the city of Ghent, lying to the southwest of the city center, between Sint-Martens-Latem, De Pinte, Zwijnaarde and Afsnee.

History

Sint-Denijs-Westrem lies on the Roman road between Kortrijk and Ghent. Archeological digs on the Flanders Expo site have shown significant signs of settlement from prehistory through the middle ages.

During the late Middle Ages the castles of Idewalle, Borluut, Darupt, Hof ten Broecke, Maaltekasteel were built in and around the Sint-Denijs-Westrem area.

In 1858, architect, artisan and designer Jean-Baptiste Bethune moved his studio from Bruges to Sint-Denijs-Westrem.

The town square ("Gemeenteplein") was built between 1895 and 1899.

Until the 20th century the area was mainly agrarian and sparsely populated; from the second half of the 20th century on the village has been steadily more densely built up, with many castle grounds subdivided for housing development.

Notes

External links
Satellite map at Maplandia.com

Sub-municipalities of Ghent
Populated places in East Flanders